Pablo Lara Rodríguez (born 30 May 1968 in Santa Clara) is a Cuban weightlifter.

He won a gold medal in the middleweight class at the 1996 Summer Olympics in Atlanta.

References

External links

1968 births
Living people
People from Santa Clara, Cuba
Cuban male weightlifters
Olympic weightlifters of Cuba
Weightlifters at the 1991 Pan American Games
Weightlifters at the 1995 Pan American Games
Weightlifters at the 1992 Summer Olympics
Weightlifters at the 1996 Summer Olympics
Olympic gold medalists for Cuba
Olympic medalists in weightlifting
Medalists at the 1996 Summer Olympics
Pan American Games gold medalists for Cuba
Medalists at the 1992 Summer Olympics
Olympic silver medalists for Cuba
Pan American Games medalists in weightlifting
World Weightlifting Championships medalists
20th-century Cuban people
21st-century Cuban people